Zameen Ke Tare is a 1960 Hindi-language children's drama film directed by Chandulal Shah and starring Daisy Irani, Honey Irani, Motilal and Achala Sachdev, with music by S. Mohinder.

Plot
A rich child and a poor one are both unhappy and search for God in the Himalayas.

Cast

 Agha
 Master Bhagwan
 Daisy Irani
 Honey Irani
 Krishna Kumari
 Motilal
 Mumtaz
 Achala Sachdev
 Tun Tun

Music
"Deep Gagan Ke Tum" - Sudha Malhotra, Asha Bhosle
"Kisi Ka Ma Na Mare Bachpan Me (Male)" - Mohammed Rafi
"Kisi Ka Ma Na Mare Bachpan Me (Duet)" - Mohammed Rafi, Asha Bhosle
"O Mere Pyaro Zameen Ke Taro" - Sudha Malhotra, Mohammed Rafi, Asha Bhosle
"Ye Zameen Hamari Ye Aasman Hamara" - Manna Dey, Asha Bhosle
"Aa Gaya Madari Le Ke Jadu Ki Pitari" - Mohammed Rafi
"Chunnu Patang Ko Kehta Kite" - Sudha Malhotra, Asha Bhosle
"Tinke Pe Tinka Chhuti" - Asha Bhosle

External links
 
 
 Zameen Ke Tare at the Bollywood Movie Database

1960s Hindi-language films
1960 films
Films scored by S. Mohinder